Palliser was a federal electoral district in Alberta, Canada, that was represented in the House of Commons of Canada from 1968 to 1979.

This riding was created in 1966 from parts of Acadia, Bow River, Calgary North, and Macleod ridings. It was abolished in 1976 when it was redistributed into Bow River, Calgary East, Calgary North, Calgary West, and Red Deer ridings.

Election results

See also 

 List of Canadian federal electoral districts
 Past Canadian electoral districts

External links
 

Former federal electoral districts of Alberta